Hilaire Roméo Verdi Momi (born 16 March 1990) is a Central African footballer who plays as a forward for SC Mouloudia Dakhla in Morocco.

He made his international debut in Central African Republic's opening game at the 2007 CEMAC Cup, scoring a goal in their 3–2 defeat to Chad.

International goals
Scores and results list Central African Republic's goal tally first.

Honours

Club
Coton Sport FC de Garoua
Elite One: 2010–11

National team
CEMAC Cup: 2009

References

External links

1990 births
Living people
Central African Republic footballers
Central African Republic expatriate footballers
Central African Republic international footballers
Association football forwards
Le Mans FC players
Coton Sport FC de Garoua players
Sint-Truidense V.V. players
R.F.C. Seraing (1922) players
Raja CA players
Ligue 2 players
Championnat National 2 players
Belgian Pro League players
Challenger Pro League players
Expatriate footballers in Belgium
Expatriate footballers in Cameroon
Expatriate footballers in France
Expatriate footballers in Morocco
People from Bangui